Rayford Trae Young (born September 19, 1998) is an American professional basketball player for the Atlanta Hawks of the National Basketball Association (NBA). He played college basketball for the Oklahoma Sooners. In 2017, he tied the then-record in National Collegiate Athletic Association (NCAA) Division I single-game assists with 22. Young became the only player to ever lead the NCAA in both points and assists in a single season. Nicknamed "Ice Trae", he was drafted by the Dallas Mavericks in the 2018 NBA draft with the fifth pick, and later traded to the Atlanta Hawks, along with a future first-round pick, for the draft rights to Luka Dončić. He joined Dončić in a unanimous selection to the 2019 NBA All-Rookie First Team. He is a two-time NBA All-Star.

Early life
Born in Lubbock, Texas, Trae is the son of Candice and Rayford Young, who played basketball at Texas Tech and professionally in Europe. He has a younger brother, Tim, and two younger sisters, Caitlyn and Camryn. Young also has an uncle who played college basketball in the NAIA. Trae was raised in Pampa, Texas, by his mother and paternal grandparents, as his father played basketball overseas.

High school career

Young attended Norman North High School in his hometown of Norman, Oklahoma. In his sophomore year, he averaged 25 points, 5 assists, and 4 rebounds per game as he helped Norman North win the 2015 area championship and was named Oklahoma's Sophomore of the Year. During his junior year, he significantly improved his game, averaging 34.2 points, 4.6 rebounds, and 4.6 assists as he led the team to a 28–4 record, winning the regional title and placing second in the 2016 Oklahoma Class 6A championship game. In his senior year, he averaged 42.6 points, 5.8 rebounds, and 4.1 assists per game while shooting at a 48.9% rate.

Recruiting
Young was considered one of the best players in the 2017 recruiting class by Scout.com, Rivals.com and ESPN. ESPN considered him the second-best point guard prospect that year, while the other websites considered him the third-best. On February 16, 2017, Young committed to the Oklahoma Sooners. He was the University of Oklahoma's first five-star recruit since Tiny Gallon in 2010.

College career
At the start of the 2017 season, on November 12, Young recorded 15 points, 10 assists, and six rebounds in a win over the Omaha Mavericks. Three days after his college debut, he recorded 22 points and a then season-high 13 assists in a win over the Ball State Cardinals. On November 26, Young recorded a season-high 43 points and seven assists in a 90–80 win over the Oregon Ducks. That game had his name draw multiple comparisons to Stephen Curry in terms of his playing style. On December 19, Young tied (with three others) the then-NCAA single-game assists record with 22, while also recording 26 points in a 105–68 win against the Northwestern State Demons. Throughout the season, Young rose from being a late first-round or a second-round pick to being a potential top-three pick for the 2018 NBA draft. He also garnered praise from both LeBron James and Stephen Curry for his season with Oklahoma. Young, however, ran into a rough patch when the West Virginia Mountaineers' Press Virginia defense forced him into eight turnovers on January 5, 2018. Furthermore, his individual defense has been rated as "poor". However, Young would recover with a season-high 43 points and 11 rebounds with seven assists in a 102–97 overtime win over the TCU Horned Frogs a week later on January 13. Three days later, Young would wind up with a season-high 12 turnovers in a loss to the Kansas State Wildcats, which surpassed his previous season-high a few weeks ago. On January 20, Young recorded a new career-high 48 points (albeit on 14-on-39 overall shooting) in a close 83–81 overtime loss to the rival Oklahoma State Cowboys. He recovered from that with a 26-point (on 7-on-9 shooting) and nine-assist effort in an 85–80 win over the fifth-ranked Kansas Jayhawks on January 23.

Young finished his freshman regular season leading the country in many statistics: assists (271), points (848), points per game (27.4), assists per game (8.7), and assist percentage (48.6%). The 848 points scored in the Big 12 would break the conference's record for most points scored by a freshman player, which was previously held by Kevin Durant and Michael Beasley. On March 7, 2018, Young was announced as the winner of the Wayman Tisdale Award for National Freshman of the Year by the United States Basketball Writers Association (USBWA). At the end of the regular season for Oklahoma, Young was also named Big 12's Freshman of the Year and was a member of the All-Big 12's First Team. In addition, he was also brought up as a consensus member of the All-American First Team, which was named throughout multiple organizations. Young also joined 2018's top two selections Deandre Ayton and Marvin Bagley III as the first consensus All-American First-Team to have three freshman players be named there. On March 15, Young recorded 28 points, seven assists, and five rebounds in an 83–78 overtime loss to the seventh-seeded Rhode Island Rams. He became the second freshman to record similar numbers of points in an NCAA Tournament game, with Chris Paul being the first player back in 2004.

Following Oklahoma's loss in the 2018 NCAA men's basketball tournament, Young announced his intention to forgo his final three seasons of collegiate eligibility and declare for the 2018 NBA draft.

Professional career

Atlanta Hawks (2018–present)

2018–19 season: All-Rookie honors 
On June 21, 2018, Young was selected with the fifth overall pick by his hometown team the Dallas Mavericks in the 2018 NBA draft, but was traded to the Atlanta Hawks along with a protected future first round pick in exchange for the rights to the third overall pick Luka Dončić. On July 1, 2018, Young officially signed with the Hawks. On October 21, in the Hawks' third game of the season, Young finished with a season-high 35 points and 11 assists in a 133–111 win over the Cleveland Cavaliers. On November 19, Young finished with a then career-high 17 assists, 25 points and three rebounds in a 127–119 loss to the Los Angeles Clippers. On February 25, 2019, Young scored a then career-high 36 points and made career high eight 3-pointers in a 119–111 loss to the Houston Rockets. On February 27, Young recorded 36 points and 10 assists in a 131–123 overtime win over the Minnesota Timberwolves. He then broke his season-high two days later on March 1, putting up a then career-high 49 points alongside 16 assists in a high-scoring 168–161 quadruple overtime loss to the Chicago Bulls. On March 31, Young scored a game-winner and had 12 points and 16 assists against the first-seeded Milwaukee Bucks. He joined Dončić in a unanimous selection to the 2019 NBA All-Rookie First Team.

2019–20 season: First All-Star selection 
On October 24, 2019, Young scored 38 points in a 117–110 season-opening win against the Detroit Pistons. On November 29, Young scored 49 points, including 21 points in the fourth quarter, in a 105–104 overtime loss to the Indiana Pacers. On January 23, 2020, he was selected for the NBA All-Star selection as a backcourt starter. On January 26, Young recorded 45 points and 14 assists in a 152–133 win against the Washington Wizards. Young wore No. 8 in the first 8 seconds of the game in memory of Kobe Bryant. Four days later, he posted 39 points and a career-high 18 assists en route to a 127–117 win over the Philadelphia 76ers. On February 9, Young registered 48 points and 13 assists in 47 minutes in a 140–135 double overtime  win over the New York Knicks. On February 20, Young scored a career-high 50 points in a 129–124 win against the Miami Heat, hitting 8-of-15 three pointers.

2020–21 season: Eastern Conference Finals appearance 
On December 23, 2020, Young put up 37 points, 7 assists, and 6 rebounds, in a 124–104 season-opening win over the Chicago Bulls. On May 23, 2021, he made his NBA playoff debut, posting 32 points, 7 rebounds and 10 assists against the New York Knicks, capping it off with a game-winning floater with 0.9 seconds left in regulation to lift the Hawks to a 107–105 victory in Game 1 of the First Round. Young also joined LeBron James, Chris Paul, and Derrick Rose as the only players in league history to record 30 points and 10 assists in their playoff debuts. In a 109–106 victory over the Philadelphia 76ers in Game 5 of the Conference Semifinals, Young put up 39 points, 7 assists, and 3 steals leading the Hawks to a 26-point comeback victory. In Game 7 of the Conference Semifinals, Young put up 21 points to lead the Hawks past the Sixers en route to their first Eastern Conference Finals appearance since 2015. In Game 1 of the Conference Finals, Young dropped a playoff career-high 48 points, alongside 11 assists and seven rebounds in a 116–113 victory over the Milwaukee Bucks. Young missed games 4 and 5 due to a bone bruise in his right foot. Young returned in game 6, but the Hawks lost 118–107, ending their season.

On August 3, 2021, Young agreed to a five-year max extension with the Hawks worth up to $172 million and possibly $207 million.

2021–22 season: First All-NBA selection
On November 14, 2021, Young scored a then season-high 42 points, along with 8 rebounds and 10 assists, to lead Atlanta to a 120–100 victory over the defending champion Milwaukee Bucks. On January 3, 2022, Young scored a career-high 56 points, along with 14 assists, in a 136–131 loss to the Portland Trail Blazers. From November 22 to January 7, Young had 17th consecutive 25-point games, breaking a tie with Dominique Wilkins for the franchise record.

On January 27, Young was selected for the 2022 NBA All-Star Game once again as a backcourt starter. On February 3, Young scored 43 points in a 124–115 win against the Phoenix Suns to end their 11-game winning streak. On February 26, Young scored 41 points and delivered 11 assists on 17-of-24 shooting from the field as Atlanta beat the Toronto Raptors 127–100; it was Young's 10th career game with at least 40 points and 10 assists, passing Michael Jordan for ninth-most all-time. On March 13, Young scored 33 of his 47 points in the first half in a 131–128 win over the Indiana Pacers. The next day, Young scored 46 points, grabbed 6 rebounds, and delivered 12 assists in a 122–113 win over the Trail Blazers, becoming the first player in the NBA this season to score 40+ on back-to-back nights and the first to do so since Bradley Beal in February 2020. On March 22, Young scored 45 points and delivered 8 assists in a 117–111 win over the New York Knicks at the Madison Square Garden. At the conclusion of the regular season, Young became the second player in NBA history to lead the league in total points and assists in a season, joining Tiny Archibald.

On April 15, during the Hawks' 107–101 play-in tournament win over the Cleveland Cavaliers to secure the No. 8 seed in the 2022 NBA playoffs, Young logged 38 points and 9 assists. He scored 32 of his points in the second half. In Game 1 of the first round against the Miami Heat, Young scored a career playoff-low 8 points on 1-for-12 shooting (0-for-7 from three-point range) and had more turnovers (six) than assists (four). His 8.3% shooting was tied for the worst field goal percentage of his career. The Hawks would go on to lose to the Heat in five games.

2022–23 season 
As Young entered his fifth NBA season, the Atlanta Hawks decided to pull off a trade receiving Dejounte Murray of the San Antonio Spurs in the process. The trade improved the Hawks' defense and reduced Young's offensive burden. His season began on October 19, 2022, against the Houston Rockets. In his first game, he put up 23 points and 13 assists. They went on to win that game 117–107 where his newly acquired teammate played his defensive role well racking up 5 steals. Five games later in the season, Young put up 42 points in a 115–123 loss against the Milwaukee Bucks. On November 25, Young scored a season-high 44 points in a 128–122 loss against the Houston Rockets.

On February 26, 2023, Young put up 34 points, eight assists, two steals, and a buzzer-beating, game-winning jumpshot in a 129–127 win over the Brooklyn Nets.

National team career
Young was a member of the U.S. men's national U18 team that won a gold medal at the 2016 FIBA Americas Under-18 Championship.

Career statistics

NBA

Regular season

|-
| style="text-align:left;"| 
| style="text-align:left;"| Atlanta
| 81 || 81 || 30.9 || .418 || .324 || .829 || 3.7 || 8.1 || .9 || .2 || 19.1
|-
| style="text-align:left;"| 
| style="text-align:left;"| Atlanta
| 60 || 60 || 35.3 || .437 || .361 || .860 || 4.3 || 9.3 || 1.1 || .1 || 29.6
|-
| style="text-align:left;"| 
| style="text-align:left;"| Atlanta
| 63 || 63 || 33.7 || .438 || .343 || .886 || 3.9 || 9.4 || .8 || .2 || 25.3
|-
| style="text-align:left;"| 
| style="text-align:left;"| Atlanta
| 76 || 76 || 34.9 || .460 || .382 || .904 || 3.7 || 9.7 || .9 || .1 || 28.4
|-
| style="text-align:left;"| 
| style="text-align:left;"| Atlanta
| 47 || 47 || 35.5 || .430 || .323 || .909 || 2.9 || 9.9 || .9 || .1 || 27.0
|- class="sortbottom"
| style="text-align:center;" colspan="2"| Career
| 280 || 280 || 33.6 || .440 || .355 || .873 || 3.9 || 9.1 || .9 || .2 || 25.3
|- class="sortbottom"
| style="text-align:center;" colspan="2"| All-Star
| 2 || 2 || 17.5 || .391 || .333 || – || 2.5 || 10.0 || 1.0 || .0 || 11.5

Playoffs

|-
| style="text-align:left;"| 2021
| style="text-align:left;"| Atlanta
| 16 || 16 || 37.7 || .418 || .313 || .866 || 2.8 || 9.5 || 1.3 || .0 || 28.8
|-
| style="text-align:left;"| 2022
| style="text-align:left;"| Atlanta
| 5 || 5 || 37.3 || .319 || .184 || .788 || 5.0 || 6.0 || .6 || .0 || 15.4
|- class="sortbottom"
| style="text-align:center;" colspan="2"| Career
| 21 || 21 || 37.6 || .402 || .286 || .850 || 3.3 || 8.7 || 1.1 || .0 || 25.6

College

|-
| style="text-align:left;"| 2017–18
| style="text-align:left;"| Oklahoma
| 32 || 32 || 35.4 || .423 || .361 || .861 || 3.9 || style="background:#cfecec;" | 8.7* || 1.7 || .3 || style="background:#cfecec;"|27.4*

Personal life
Young has three younger siblings. His father played basketball for Texas Tech. Young is a Christian.

Young followed the footsteps of Donovan Mitchell by being featured in the second season of the Young Hollywood original docu-series Rookie on the Rise. The series follows Young on his race for the Rookie of the Year.

Young is currently engaged to his longtime partner Shelby Miller, whom he met at the University of Oklahoma in 2017. They had a son in June 2022.

See also

 List of NCAA Division I men's basketball players with 20 or more assists in a game

Notes

References

External links

 Oklahoma Sooners bio
 USA Basketball bio
 

1998 births
Living people
21st-century African-American sportspeople
African-American basketball players
All-American college men's basketball players
American men's basketball players
Atlanta Hawks players
Basketball players from Oklahoma
Dallas Mavericks draft picks
McDonald's High School All-Americans
National Basketball Association All-Stars
Oklahoma Sooners men's basketball players
Point guards
Sportspeople from Lubbock, Texas
Sportspeople from Norman, Oklahoma